Pagel is a surname and it may refer to:

 Bernard Pagel, British astrophysicist
Christina Pagel, British-German mathematician
 Dave Pagel, American politician
 David Pagel, American an art critic
 Derek Pagel, American football player 
 Garry Pagel, South African rugby player 
 Julius Leopold Pagel, German physician and historian of medicine
 Karl Pagel, American baseball player
 Mark Pagel, evolutionary biologist
 Mike Pagel, American football player
 Peter Pagel, German footballer
 Ramona Pagel, American shot putter
 Walter Pagel, German pathologist

See also
 Pagels, a surname

Surnames from given names